Mongrel Nation is a 3-part series released in 2003 and hosted by Eddie Izzard on the Discovery Channel, examining the ethnic origins of the English.

The three programmes were titled: Invasion, Immigration, and Infusion.

External links 
 

Discovery Channel original programming